Cliftleigh is a small suburb, and planned development in the City of Cessnock, New South Wales, Australia.

As at the 2016 Census, Cliftleigh had a population of almost 900, with a potential of an additional 3,000 residents or more

History

Geography 

The hottest day recorded was 46oc on 04/01/2020

The coldest day recorded was -0.6oc on 02/09/1971

Transport 
Transportation services are provided by Rover Coaches. Access is provided by a main road that passes directly through Cliftleigh. During heavy rain, floods at Tester's Hollow block the road to Gillieston Heights. The South Maitland Railway is nearby, but does not provide passenger rail services.

Retail 
Woolworths has a supermarket in nearby Maitland. Kurri Kurri Coles and Aldi are nearby. The project plan specifies a community center and shopping center, including supermarkets. Gillieston Heights being a short drive from Cliftleigh has a small complex with IGA, McDonalds, Domino's, laundromat and tobacconist.

Environs 
Cliftleigh's surroundings are diverse, and include wetlands, trees and views of the Mount Sugarloaf and Brokenback ranges.

Amenities 
Cliftleigh is less than 2 km away from the popular Kurri Kurri golf course. A drive-in operates at Heddon Greta.

References

Suburbs of City of Cessnock
Suburbs of Maitland, New South Wales

Localities in New South Wales